Kretz is a municipality in the district of Mayen-Koblenz in Rhineland-Palatinate, western Germany.

References

Municipalities in Rhineland-Palatinate
Mayen-Koblenz